Skeeters Creek is a stream in the U.S. state of Oregon.

Skeeters Creek was named in the 1850s after Isaac Skeeters, a pioneer settler. A variant name is "Skeeter Creek".

References

Rivers of Oregon
Rivers of Jackson County, Oregon